{{DISPLAYTITLE:Nu2 Arae}}

Nu2 Arae, Latinized from ν2 Arae, is the Bayer designation for a star in the southern constellation of Ara. The stellar classification of B9.5 III-IV shows this to be a B-type star with a spectrum that displays features part way between the subgiant and giant star stages.

The star is sometimes referred as Upsilon2 Arae (υ2 Arae).

References

External links
 Aladin previewer: Image of HD 161917

B-type giants
B-type subgiants
Ara (constellation)
Arae, Nu2
Durchmusterung objects
161917
087379
6632